van Helden is a Dutch toponymic surname meaning "from Helden", a town in Dutch Limburg. Notable people with the surname include:

Armand Van Helden (born 1970), American musician, DJ and music producer
Gerard Van Helden (1848–1901), Detective Superintendent in the Birmingham City Police
Hans van Helden (born 1948), Dutch speed skater
John van Helden (born 1950s), New Zealand footballer
Marie-France van Helden (born 1959), French speed skater, wife of Hans van Helden
Robin van Helden (born 1965), Dutch middle distance runner

References

Dutch-language surnames
Toponymic surnames
Surnames of Dutch origin